Communauté d'agglomération de la Provence Verte is an intercommunal structure, centred on the cities of Brignoles and Saint-Maximin-la-Sainte-Baume. It is located in the Var department, in the Provence-Alpes-Côte d'Azur region, southeastern France. It was created in January 2017. Its seat is in Brignoles. Its area is 947.5 km2. Its population was 98,529 in 2017, of which 17,179 in Brignoles proper.

Composition
The communauté d'agglomération consists of the following 28 communes:

Bras
Brignoles
Camps-la-Source
Carcès
La Celle
Châteauvert
Correns
Cotignac
Entrecasteaux
Forcalqueiret
Garéoult
Mazaugues
Méounes-lès-Montrieux
Montfort-sur-Argens
Nans-les-Pins
Néoules
Ollières
Plan-d'Aups-Sainte-Baume
Pourcieux
Pourrières
Rocbaron
La Roquebrussanne
Rougiers
Sainte-Anastasie-sur-Issole
Saint-Maximin-la-Sainte-Baume
Tourves
Le Val
Vins-sur-Caramy

References

Provence Verte
Provence Verte